Daniel E. Koshland may refer to:
Daniel E. Koshland Jr. (1920–2007), American scientist
Daniel E. Koshland Sr. (1892–1979), American businessman